Han Oen Lee, Luitenant der Chinezen (1856—1893) was a Chinese-Indonesian magnate, who governed the Chinese community of Bekasi as its Luitenant der Chinezen, an important administrative post in the Dutch colonial bureaucracy. He was also the Landheer (landlord) of the particuliere land (private domain) of Gaboes. Today, he is best known as the father of the late colonial statesman Hok Hoei Kan (1881—1951).

Born in Surabaya, East Java, Dutch East Indies in 1856, Han Oen Lee Sia came from the influential Han family of Lasem, part of the 'Cabang Atas' gentry of colonial Indonesia. His father, Han Tjoei Hing Sia (died in 1882), was a local landlord and a great-grandson of Han Khee Bing, Luitenant der Chinezen (1749—1768), who was in turn the eldest son of Han Bwee Kong, Kapitein der Chinezen of Surabaya (1727—1778), an important ally and comprador of the Dutch East India Company. As the issue of a long line of Chinese officers, Han bore the hereditary title of Sia from birth. 

On March 8, 1876, Han married the heiress Kan Oe Nio (1850—1910), who was six years his senior, at the bride's hometown of Batavia, capital of the Dutch East Indies. Han's wife was a daughter of one of the colony's wealthiest tycoons, Kan Keng Tjong (1797—1871), and Jo Heng Nio (1827—1900), as well as a sister-in-law of Lie Tjoe Hong, the 3rd Majoor der Chinezen of Batavia. Han and his wife had three children: Han Khing Bie Sia (1878—1864), Han Khing Tjiang Sia (later known as Hok Hoei Kan) and Han Tek Nio (1883—1969).

On April 15, 1886, Han Oen Lee Sia was appointed by the Dutch colonial government to the post of Luitenant der Chinezen of Bekasi, a district located east of Batavia, in the region of Han's private domain of Gaboes (now in Bekasi Regency). There, Luitenant Han Oen Lee introduced a new variety of rice from Fujian in southern China, which had larger grains and produced a more plentiful harvest. Han also operated a steam-powered rice mill on the estate.

Luitenant Han Oen Lee served in his government position until his untimely death due to a major fire in Batavia's Chinese quarter, Glodok, in 1893. Family lore recounts how the Luitenant climbed up to the roof of his family house, holding two sacred family krises, named Pangeran Api (prince of fire) and Pangeran Angin (prince of wind), thus magically diverting the fire away. Jakarta folklore has it that the fire leapt over the Molenvliet canal thanks to the magical power of the krises. Han, however, died from fire-related injuries a few days later.

On his death, his eldest son, Han Khing Bie Sia, inherited Gaboes. His younger son, Han Khing Tjiang Sia, was adopted by his childless brother-in-law, Kan Tjeng Soen (1855—1896), renamed Kan Hok Hoei Sia and was made the principal heir of the name and fortune of the latter's maternal grandfather, Kan Keng Tjong. Han's youngest son, as Hok Hoei Kan, became a leading politician of the late colonial period.

Ancestry

References

1856 births
1893 deaths
Kapitan Cina
Cabang Atas
Indonesian people of Chinese descent
People from Batavia, Dutch East Indies
People from Jakarta
People from Surabaya
People of the Dutch East Indies
Han family of Lasem
Sia (title)